Robinstown (Levinge) is a townland in Mullingar in County Westmeath, Ireland.

Famine burial ground 
A mass grave that contains the remains of victims of the Great Famine is located in the townland.

References 

Townlands of County Westmeath